Józef Buzek (16 November 1873 in Końska – 22 September 1936 in Cieszyn) was a Polish lawyer, economist, statistician and politician from the region of Cieszyn Silesia.

He was born in the village of Końska to a peasant's family. He graduated from state gymnasium in Cieszyn in 1894. He then studied law at the Jagiellonian University in Kraków and in Vienna, eventually earning a law degree at Jagiellonian University in 1899 and habilitation at Lwów University in 1902. Buzek was also politically active and was a deputy in the Imperial Council in Vienna from 1907 to 1918. He worked as a statistician in Vienna and was a chairman of Statistic Office in Lwów. He was the first director of the Polish Central Statistical Office from 1918 to 1929. Buzek was a member of the Sejm (1919–1922) and the Senate (1922–1927). Buzek wrote many books about statistics, national and political issues.

Józef Buzek is related to Jan Buzek and Jerzy Buzek, Polish politicians.

Works 
 Proces wynarodowienia w świetle nowszej statystyki narodowościowej państw europejskich (1903)
 Historya polityki narodowościowej rządu pruskiego wobec Polaków : od traktatów wiedeńskich do ustaw wyjątkowych z r. 1908 (1909)
 Rozwój stanu szkół średnich w Galicyi w ciągu ostatnich lat 50 (1859–1909) (1909)
 Administracya gospodarstwa społecznego : wykłady z zakresu nauki administracyi i austryackiego prawa (1913)
 Pogląd na wzrost ludności ziem polskich w wieku XIX (1915)
 Projekt konstytucji państwa polskiego i ordynacji wyborczej sejmowej oraz uzasadnienie i porównianie projektu konstytucji państwa polskiego z innemi konstytucjami (1918)
 Główne zasady polityczne ordynacji wyborczej do Sejmu i Senatu : studjum krytyczno-porównawcze (1922)
 Problemat równowagi budżetu państwowego w świetle statystyki finansowej (1923)
 Główne zasady politycznego programu agrarnego w dziedzinie handlowo-celnej : referat wygłoszony na posiedzeniu klubu posłów i senatorów P. S. L. w dniu 27 listopada 1925 r. (1925)
 Program gospodarczy Rzeczypospolitej i środki naprawy obecnych stosunków w rolnictwie  (1927)

References 
 
 

 

 
 
 
 
 

1873 births
1936 deaths
People from Třinec
People from Austrian Silesia
Polish people from Zaolzie
Polish Lutherans
National-Democratic Party (Poland) politicians
Polish People's Party "Piast" politicians
Members of the Austrian House of Deputies (1907–1911)
Members of the Austrian House of Deputies (1911–1918)
Members of the Legislative Sejm of the Second Polish Republic
Senators of the Second Polish Republic (1922–1927)
20th-century Polish economists
20th-century Polish lawyers
Polish statisticians
Jagiellonian University alumni
University of Lviv alumni